Saurin may refer to:

Bernard-Joseph Saurin (1706–1781), a Parisian lawyer, poet, and playwright
Jacques Saurin (1677–1730), a French preacher 
James Saurin (1760–1842), an Irish Anglican bishop 
Joseph Saurin (1659–1737), a French mathematician 
Vincent Saurin, French Olympic rower
William Saurin (1757–1839), an Attorney-General for Ireland
Saurin, Ontario, a community in the township of Springwater, Ontario
The Saurin (Star Wars), a fictional race in the Star Wars universe